The 2012 Vuelta a España was the 67th edition of the Vuelta a España, one of the cycling's Grand Tours. The Vuelta a España features 198 riders competing from 22 cycling teams; the race took place from 18 August to 9 September, starting in Pamplona and finishing in Madrid.

Teams
All eighteen UCI ProTeams were automatically invited and were obliged to attend the race. Four UCI Professional Continental teams were given wildcard places into the race, to complete a 22-team peloton.

The 22 teams that competed in the race were:

 
 *
 *
 
 
 *
 *
 
 
 
 
 
 
 
 
 
 
 
 
 
 
 

*: Pro Continental teams given wild card entry to this event.

By rider

See also 
 2012 Vuelta a España

References

External links 
 

2012 Vuelta a España
2012